24626 Astrowizard, provisional designation , is a dark background asteroid from the central regions of the asteroid belt, approximately 7 kilometers in diameter. It was discovered on 9 October 1980, by American astronomer couple Carolyn and Eugene Shoemaker at the Palomar Observatory in California, United States. The asteroid was named for American science educator David Rodrigues, who would perform at public events as "The Astro Wizard".

Orbit and classification 

Astrowizard is a non-family from the main belt's background population. It orbits the Sun in the central asteroid belt at a distance of 2.0–3.6 AU once every 4 years and 7 months (1,685 days; semi-major axis of 2.77 AU). Its orbit has an eccentricity of 0.29 and an inclination of 8° with respect to the ecliptic. The body's observation arc begins at the discovering observatory just two nights prior to its official discovery observation.

Physical characteristics 

Based on its geometric albedo of 0.072, Astrowizard is possibly a carbonaceous C-type asteroid.

Rotation period 

As of 2018, no rotational lightcurve of Astrowizard has been obtained from photometric observations. The body's rotation period, pole and shape remain unknown.

Diameter and albedo 

According to the survey carried out by the NEOWISE mission of NASA's Wide-field Infrared Survey Explorer, Astrowizard measures 6.528 kilometers in diameter and its surface has an albedo of 0.072.

Naming 

This minor planet was named by the discoverers after David V. Rodrigues (born 1952), an American astronomical lecturer at the Morrison Planetarium at the California Academy of Sciences in San Francisco. He is known for his educational outreach on astronomy to the public and school children, wearing a wizard costume.

The official naming citation was published by the Minor Planet Center on 1 May 2003.

References

External links 
 Asteroid Lightcurve Database (LCDB), query form (info )
 Dictionary of Minor Planet Names, Google books
 Asteroids and comets rotation curves, CdR – Observatoire de Genève, Raoul Behrend
 Discovery Circumstances: Numbered Minor Planets (20001)-(25000) – Minor Planet Center
 
 

024626
Discoveries by Carolyn S. Shoemaker
Discoveries by Eugene Merle Shoemaker
Named minor planets
19801009